Alejo Muniz (born February 22, 1990) is a Brazilian professional surfer who competes on the World Surf League Men's Qualifying Series.

Career

Victories

WSL World Championship Tour

External links

References

1990 births
Living people
Brazilian surfers